"Lost Again" is a song by Swiss electronic band Yello, released by Stiff Records in 1983 as the fourth single from Yello's third album You Gotta Say Yes to Another Excess.

Track listing 
7" single

Track listing 
12" single

In popular media
The song was used in the Steve Martin and John Candy movie Planes, Trains and Automobiles, and also as the intro for the last series of BBC 2's Oxford Road Show.

Charts

References 

Yello songs
1983 songs
1983 singles
Boris Blank
Songs written by Dieter Meier
Stiff Records singles
Vertigo Records singles
Polydor Records singles